The  (M3/A3) in Brisbane, Queensland, Australia, is a major urban road corridor. It connects Eight Mile Plains to Bald Hills via the following corridors:

 (M3) Pacific Motorway between Eight Mile Plains and Brisbane CBD
 (M3) Inner City Bypass and Horace Street between Brisbane CBD and Bowen Hills
 (A3) Lutwyche Road between Bowen Hills and Kedron
 (A3) Gympie Road between Kedron and Carseldine
 (M3) Gympie Arterial Road between Carseldine and Bald Hills

Major intersections
Each of the component roads (except Lutwyche Road, which does not have a Wikipedia article) has a road junction list.

Brisbane Metroads